The Herb Carnegie Centennial Centre, formerly named the North York Centennial Centre, is a multi-purpose arena in Toronto, Ontario, Canada. It was built in 1966 and occasionally hosted the Toronto Marlboros of the Ontario Hockey League. It was renamed on May 2, 2001 for Herb Carnegie, a black Canadian ice hockey pioneer. This arena hosts the North York Rangers of the Ontario Junior Hockey League team. The arena also offers leisure skating organized by the City of Toronto government. It is located at Finch Avenue and Bathurst Street in the district of North York. It is located next to the Centennial Library, a branch of Toronto Public Library. During the summer, the arena becomes a dry pad for other sports, such as lacrosse..

References

Ice hockey venues in Toronto
Indoor arenas in Ontario
Indoor ice hockey venues in Ontario
Ontario Hockey League arenas
Sports venues in Toronto